Petr Novák (born 18 June 1982) is a Czech cross-country skier. He competed at the FIS Nordic World Ski Championships 2011 in Oslo, and at the 2014 Winter Olympics in Sochi.

References

External links 
 

1982 births
Living people
Cross-country skiers at the 2014 Winter Olympics
Czech male cross-country skiers
Olympic cross-country skiers of the Czech Republic
Sportspeople from Karlovy Vary